Aleksandr Vasilyevich Ilyin (born 5 February 1993) is a Russian professional football player.

Club career
He made his Russian Premier League debut for FC Dynamo Moscow on 28 August 2011 in a game against PFC Spartak Nalchik, as a late substitute. That was his only official game for Dynamo Moscow main team, he mostly played for the reserve team of the club. Previously, he played for FC Spartak Moscow academy and reserves.

2015 road accident
On 12 September 2015, he was arrested and charged with causing a death by negligence due to driving under the influence of alcohol. According to the court case, he drove his car at high speed—the wrong way into the oncoming traffic for 7 kilometers—on Novopriozerskoye highway between villages Kerro and Agalatovo in the Vsevolozhsky District, in the St. Petersburg metropolitan area, hitting two cars and seriously injuring the people in those, before hitting a third car head-on and killing two passengers in that third car. The victims were a 28-year-old house painter Sergei Selivanov from St. Petersburg (a father of five children) and a 27-year-old engineer Maksim Kayumov.

On 5 September 2016, he was sentenced to 5 years and 10 month of imprisonment for the crash.

External links

References

1993 births
People from Kemerovo Oblast
Living people
Russian footballers
Association football midfielders
FC Dynamo Moscow players
FC Dynamo Saint Petersburg players
FC Sakhalin Yuzhno-Sakhalinsk players
FC Spartak Moscow players
FC Znamya Truda Orekhovo-Zuyevo players
Russian Premier League players
Russian First League players
Russian Second League players
Crimean Premier League players
Sportspeople convicted of crimes
Sportspeople from Kemerovo Oblast